Helena Elsa Margareta Willis (born 16 April 1964, Stockholm) is a Swedish illustrator and author.

Bibliography

2002–present – LasseMajas detektivbyrå (book series, written by Martin Widmark)
1994 – Sveriges miljöbästa butik (written by Hanne Simonsen)
1994 – EU, konsumenten och miljön (written by My Laurell)
1996 – Omtankar (written by Annika Forsberg)
1997 – Kaspar, Atom-Ragnar och gäddkungen (written by Mikael Engström)
1998 – Atom-Ragnar och snömannen (written by Mikael Engström)
1999 – Andra världskriget (written by Ulf Eskilsson)
1999 – Vilse i stenåldern (written by Bengt-Åke Cras)
1999 – Atom-Ragnar och mordbrännaren (written by Mikael Engström)
2001 – Kaspar och snömannen (written by Mikael Engström)
2001 – Hanna luras av Nalle Puh (written by Ulf Eskilsson)
2001 – Hanna och cykeln (written by Ulf Eskilsson)
2001 – Hanna och veckopengen (written by Ulf Eskilsson)
2001 – Hanna är hundvakt (written by Ulf Eskilsson)
2003 – Kaspar och båtsnurran (written by Mikael Engström)
2006 – Olga kastar lasso (also writer)
2007 – Olga och Stefan kräver guld (also writer)

Awards
2010 – Bokjuryn (For the book Campingmysteriet in the series LasseMajas detektivbyrå, together with Martin Widmark)
2005 – Spårhunden & Bokjuryn (For the LasseMaja-book Tidningsmysteriet)

References

External links
Helena Willis on www.bonniercarlsen.se
Interview with Helena Willis

Swedish illustrators
1964 births
Living people
Artists from Stockholm
Swedish-language writers
Swedish women writers
Swedish women illustrators